Something Wicked is a 2014 American independent psychological horror film directed by Darin Scott and starring Shantel VanSanten, John Robinson, Julian Morris, James Patrick Stuart, Robert Blanche, and Brittany Murphy. The film follows a young woman who is tormented after a tragic accident which led to the death of her parents. The film also marks the final film appearance of Brittany Murphy, who died on December 20, 2009. Filming took place between April and June 2009 in Eugene, Oregon.

Plot
Christine, a virgin bride-to-be and her fiancé, James have a promising future ahead of them. Christine has just been accepted to Oregon University and is excited both about the prospect of her education, but also the chance to start a family of her own. However, a gruesome car crash leaves both of her parents dead and Christine is overwhelmed with grief. As her wedding day approaches, the terror only gets worse as she tries to convince others that she is being stalked. Her psychiatrist, Susan, feels that Christine is displaying signs of PTSD as dark secrets from the past slowly emerge.

Cast
 Shantel VanSanten as Christine Webb
 John Robinson as James Campbell
 Brittany Murphy as Susan Webb
 Julian Morris as Ryan Anderson
 James Patrick Stuart as Bill Webb 
 Robert Blanche as John Anderson

Production
Filming took place in the spring of 2009 in Eugene, Oregon.

Release
The film had its world premiere in Eugene, Oregon, where it was also filmed, on April 4, 2014. It added a few more cities such as Portland and Seattle the following week. It was released in Southern California and Nevada on September 12, 2014.

References

External links
 
 

American psychological horror films
2014 films
2014 horror films
2014 psychological thriller films
Films shot in Eugene, Oregon
Films shot in Oregon
2010s English-language films
Films directed by Darin Scott
2010s American films